Ganadhal  (also spelled as Ganadhala) is a village near Gillesugur village in the Raichur taluk of Raichur district in the Indian state of Karnataka. Ganadhal is famous for the Sri Panchamukhi Hanuman Temple where Sri Raghavendra Swamiji did penance for 12 years. Ganadhal can be reached from Raichur and Mantralayam.

Legend
The legend of this temple dates back to Ramayana. According to it, when Ravana lost all his sons and commanders, he summoned his step-brother Ahiravan/Mahiravana, who was an adept in Maya (illusion). Hearing this, Vibheeshana (Ravana's righteous brother, who sided with Rama), warned Rama and the other Vanaras. As per Rama's instruction, Hanuman built a fortress from his tail, where Rama, Lakshmana and the Vanaras were protected. The discus Sudarshana stood at the top of the fortress.

Mahiravana, who learned of this, assumed the form of Vibheeshana and approached Hanuman at night, saying that he had got a few magical threads, which could protect Rama from demons. The unsuspecting Hanuman let him in. He rendered Rama and Lakshmana unconscious, turned them into dolls an escaped to Manivarthanapura, his capital city in Patala. When Hanuman saw the real Vibheeshana outside, he doubted him. But, he soon realised the truth and entered, only to find all the Vanaras unconscious and Rama-Lakshmana missing. Hanuman repented and decided to himself bring them back. Vibheeshana informed him that there were two gateways to Mahiravana's palace; one was in Ravana's palace, the other was through a cave in present-day Ganadhal. Hanuman went through the cave and soon reached Manivarthanapura. He saw that a dark lady with blood-red eyes stopped him. Hanuman informed her about his mission of saving Rama. She said "I am Yerukalamma, the guardian of this city. No one can enter here without my permission. But Mahiravana is doomed. His death is approaching him." and let him in.

As Hanuman entered, he encountered a Vanara, who fought with him. When Hanuman defeated him, a damsel named Deerghadehi came and said "Oh lord, spare him. He is your own son. While you were building a bridge to Lanka, I drank your sweat drops, and he was born. Please bless him. I have named him Mastyavallabha" Hanuman blessed him and proceeding further, was surprised to see another damsel crying and calling Rama's name. He silently approached her and learnt that she was Chandrasena, who had wished to marry Vishnu, but was abducted by Mahiravana. Hanuman also learnt that Mahiravana's soul was not in his body, and was somewhere hidden. He asked her to pretend to love Mahiravana and learn from him about his soul. Hanuman also met Rama-Lakshmana, who were imprisoned in the temple of Yerukalamma. He bowed to them and said that he would soon free them and take them back. Then, he caused havoc in Manivarthanapura by killing demons. Mahiravana, who tried to kill him, was rendered unconscious.

Later, when he approached Chandrasena, she pretended to love him, and asked him to marry her as soon as possible. She said "What will happen if you suddenly die?". Mahiravana said "Don't worry. My soul is in the form of five bees, that wander outside the earth. Their humming is fatal, and they live under a rock near the entrance to my city. Only if they are killed together, I can die." After he left, Chandrasena reported everything to Hanuman, who thanked her and approached the rock.

He thought "If I had five faces, I could have swallowed all five bees at once. Oh Sri Rama, help me" and he started praying. Instantly, a new strength enveloped him, and he assumed the form of having five faces (one his own, the others Varaha, Garuda, Narasimha and Hayagriva) and swallowed all five bees at once. At the same time, Mahiravana, who was preparing to sacrifice Rama-Lakshmana, fell down and died. Rama, who was set free, blessed Chandrasena and returned to the Vanara camp, along with Hanuman and Lakshmana.

Thousands of years later, in the 16th century, Sri Raghavendra had a vision of Panchamukhi Hanuman, Lakshmi Venkatesha and Kurma. Later, someone named Bheemayya built the temple. Now, his four children, headed by Shamachar, have become the chief priests of the temple

Demographics
 India census, Ganadhal had a population of 4,266 with 2,149 males and 2,117 females and 758 households.

See also
 Naradagadde
 Bichali
 Mantralayam
 Raichur

References

External links
 http://Raichur.nic.in/

Villages in Raichur district